The EJE Bridge over Shell Creek is a Warren pony truss bridge located near Shell, Wyoming, which carries Big Horn County Road CN9-57 across Shell Creek. The bridge was built in 1920 by the Midland Bridge Company, the only firm to bid for the bridge contract.

The bridge was added to the National Register of Historic Places on February 22, 1985. It was one of several bridges added to the National Register for their role in the history of Wyoming bridge construction.

The Bridge was removed and replaced in 2005.  

http://bridgehunter.com/wy/big-horn/EJE/

See also
List of bridges documented by the Historic American Engineering Record in Wyoming

References

External links

Road bridges on the National Register of Historic Places in Wyoming
Bridges completed in 1920
Buildings and structures in Big Horn County, Wyoming
Historic American Engineering Record in Wyoming
National Register of Historic Places in Big Horn County, Wyoming
Warren truss bridges in the United States
1920 establishments in Wyoming